Bernarda Albas Haus ('The House of Bernarda Alba') is a 2000 German-language opera in three acts by Aribert Reimann to a libretto by the composer after Enrique Beck's German translation of Federico García Lorca's play La casa de Bernarda Alba (1936).

References

Operas by Aribert Reimann
2000 operas
Operas based on plays
Operas
German-language operas